Jagmander Singh (born 1 March 1956) is an Indian wrestler. He competed at the 1980 Summer Olympics and the 1984 Summer Olympics.

References

External links
 

1956 births
Living people
Indian male sport wrestlers
Olympic wrestlers of India
Wrestlers at the 1980 Summer Olympics
Wrestlers at the 1984 Summer Olympics
Place of birth missing (living people)
Wrestlers at the 1974 Asian Games
Wrestlers at the 1978 Asian Games
Wrestlers at the 1982 Asian Games
Asian Games competitors for India
Commonwealth Games medallists in wrestling
Commonwealth Games gold medallists for India
Commonwealth Games silver medallists for India
Recipients of the Arjuna Award
Wrestlers at the 1978 Commonwealth Games
Wrestlers at the 1982 Commonwealth Games
Medallists at the 1978 Commonwealth Games
Medallists at the 1982 Commonwealth Games